The 1990 Alaska Air Force season was the 5th season of the franchise in the Philippine Basketball Association (PBA).

Draft picks

Scoring record
April 26: Paul Alvarez scored a record-breaking 71 points in Alaska's 169-138 win over Shell. The 71-point output by Mr.Excitement surpass Allan Caidic's 68 points set in November of last year.

Occurrences
Assistant coach Chot Reyes took over the coaching duties from coach Tim Cone for a couple of games in the All-Filipino Conference following the Basketball Coaches of the Philippines (BCOP) decision issuing a temporary restraining order preventing coach Tim Cone from handling the team. Reyes led Alaska to its first win in the conference with a 100-99 squeaker over Purefoods on June 17.

Runner-up finish
Sean Chambers return as their import in the Third Conference and along with Carlos Clark, a member of the 1984 NBA World Champions Boston Celtics. The Airmen were the top team in the elimination round with eight wins and two losses, they scored their 12th victory in 17 games against Shell, 114-94 on November 27. The Airmen got a free ride for the first finals berth when Purefoods lost to Sarsi in their last game in the semifinals on December 2.

Alaska went on to battle the Purefoods Hotdogs for the Third Conference championship and came so close in winning their first PBA title after surging ahead, 2-0 in the best-of-five finals series, only to lose the remaining three games. High-leaping Paul Alvarez, who played the hero's role in their first two victories, was injured in Game three and was out for the rest of the final playoffs.

Roster

Transactions

Mid-season acquisition

Trades

Recruited imports

References

Alaska Aces (PBA) seasons
Alaska